Pankaj Jain (born 1970) is a professor of Philosophy, Religious Studies, Film Studies, Sustainability, and Diaspora Studies. He has authored three books and has co-edited the Hinduism Section of the Encyclopedia of Indian Religions. His articles have appeared in multiple academic journals and popular websites.

Education and career 

Jain graduated with a Bachelor of Engineering in Computer Science from Karnataka University in 1992 and began teaching at the M.B.M. Engineering College, Jodhpur. He moved to the US in 1996. After working as an IT professional for a few years, he joined Columbia University in 2002 to pursue M.A. in Indian Religions. In 2008, he received a Ph.D. from the University of Iowa in Indian Religions and Ecology.

In 2007, he taught Sanskrit, Hindi, and Hinduism at Rutgers University for a year. From 2008 to 2010, he taught Indian languages at North Carolina State University. In 2010 he joined the Department of Philosophy and Religion and Department of Anthropology at the University of North Texas. He has been a research affiliate at the Pluralism Project by Harvard University, the first Hindu-Jain scholar-in-residence at Greenfaith, an American interfaith environmental coalition, and the India representative for the International Society for Environmental Ethics.

He is currently the Head of the Department of Humanities and Languages and also the Chair of The India Centre at FLAME University. He convened the first Indic Studies conference in collaboration with the Indian Institute of Advanced Study in May 2021.

Works 

Monographs:
 Dharma and Ecology of Hindu Communities: Sustenance and Sustainability
Reviews - 
 Science and Socio-Religious Revolution in India: Moving the Mountains
Reviews - 
 Dharma in America: A Short History of Hindu-Jain Diaspora
Reviews - 
Edited volumes:
 Encyclopedia of Indian Religions- Hinduism and Tribal Religions
 Indian and Western Philosophical Concepts in Religion
Articles:
Essays in the Journal of Visual Anthropology

Awards and Recognitions 
Jain's first book was selected for the DANAM Book Prize and Uberoi Foundation Award. He is a recipient of the Fulbright-Nehru Fellowship for Environmental Leadership and Wenner-Gren Grant. In addition, he was nominated for the Sustainability Leadership Award from Memnosyne Institute.

References 

Karnatak University alumni

External links 
 
 Profile at FLAME University

1970 births
Living people
Scholars from Rajasthan
Columbia University alumni
University of Iowa alumni
Academic staff of FLAME University
Indian religion academics
Hindu writers
Hindu studies scholars
Indian Jain writers